Meruert Kamalidenova (born 3 August 2005) is a Kazakhstani chess player who holds the title of International Women Master (2021). World Youth Chess Championship winner (2019).

Biography
Meruert Kamalidenova was multiple winner of Kazakhstani Youth Chess Championships in various age groups. She has repeatedly represented Kazakhstan in the World and Asian Youth Chess Championships in various age groups, where she has won World Youth Chess Championship U14 girls age group (2019), Asian Youth Chess Championship U12 girls age group (2017) and Asian Youth Chess Championship U14 girls age group.

In November 2021 in Riga Meruert Kamalidenova ranked in 31st place in FIDE Women's Grand Swiss Tournament 2021.

She was awarded the Woman International Master (WIM) title in 2021.

References

External links

2005 births
Kazakhstani female chess players
Chess Woman International Masters
Living people
21st-century Kazakhstani women